A statue of American basketball player Shaquille O'Neal by artists Omri Amrany and Julie Rotblatt-Amrany is installed outside Crypto.com Arena in Los Angeles, California. The 9-foot-tall, 1,200 pound sculpture was installed in 2017.

References 

Monuments and memorials in Los Angeles
Outdoor sculptures in Greater Los Angeles
Sculptures of African Americans
Sculptures of men in California
Shaquille O'Neal
South Park (Downtown Los Angeles)
Statues in Los Angeles
Statues of sportspeople